Dêgê County is a county in southern China, which was formerly one of the Kham region's five independent kingdoms - the Kingdom of Derge - but is now administered as a county in Garzê Tibetan Autonomous Prefecture in far northwestern Sichuan, China, bordering the Tibet Autonomous Region to the west. Its county seat is the town of Derge.

Towns and townships 
 Gengqing Town
 Maisu Township
 Puma Township
 Yueba Township
 Babang Township
 Gongya Township
 Baiya Township
 Wangbuding Township
 Keluodong Township
 Kasongdu Township
 Enan Township
 Zhuqing Township
 Ezhi Township
 Manigange Township
 Yulong Township
 Cuo'a Township
 Zhongzhake Township
 Shangrangu Township
 Wogong Township
 Wentuo Township
 Niangu Township
 Langduo Township
 Axu Township
 Dagun Townshp
 Yading Township
 Suoba Township

Transport 
China National Highway 317

Climate

References

External links

Official website of Dêgê County Government

County-level divisions of Sichuan
Populated places in the Garzê Tibetan Autonomous Prefecture